III is the third studio album from Canadian jazz instrumental hip hop band BadBadNotGood. It was released on May 6, 2014. It is the group's first album of completely original material.

Reception

Upon its release, III received positive reviews. At Metacritic, which assigns a weighted mean rating out of 100 to reviews from mainstream critics, the album received an average score of 72 based on 8 reviews, which indicates "generally favorable".

In the review for AllMusic, James Pearce claimed that "III captures the raw energy, togetherness, and musicianship of a live concert, at points drifting off at a tangent and then rejoining to climactic chord structures and beautiful jazz melodies."

The album was a longlisted nominee for the 2014 Polaris Music Prize.

Track listing
All songs are produced by BADBADNOTGOOD and Frank Dukes.

Personnel
Credits adapted from the album's liner notes.

BADBADNOTGOOD
Matthew Tavares – piano, keyboards, synthesizer, electric guitar; composer and producer
Chester Hansen – bass guitar, upright bass, electric guitar, synthesizer, sampler; composer and producer
Alexander Sowinski – drums, percussion, synthesizer, sampler; composer and producer, photographer
Additional contributors 
Leland Whitty – tenor & baritone saxophone, bass clarinet; violin & viola (track 5); composer (track 3)
Tommy Paxton-Beesley – cello & violin; electric guitar (track 9); string arranger (track 9) 
Tom Moffat – trumpet
Frank Dukes – producer, assistant engineer
Stephen Koszler – mixing, engineer
Matt MacNeil – assistant engineer
João Carvalho – mastering

Charts

References

External links
 
 BadBadNotGood on Tumblr
 BadBadNotGood on Bandcamp

2014 albums
Post-bop albums
BadBadNotGood albums
Innovative Leisure albums
Albums produced by Frank Dukes